Apollo Gauntlet is an American adult animated television series created and written by Canadian animator Myles Langlois, which is an adaptation of his independent web series of the same name, released in 2012 on Rug Burn, a YouTube network born from a partnership between Titmouse, Inc. and 6 Point Harness. It follows the eponymous superhero as he fights evil in a futuristic medieval society.

Produced for Adult Swim by the companies 6 Point Harness, Mosaic and Williams Street, its pilot episode was aired on December 4, 2016, while the series aired from July 9 to August 13, 2017. The series was not picked up for a second season.

Plot
Apollo Gauntlet is the pseudonym of Paul Cassidy, a police officer from Winnipeg, Manitoba who gets sent to a futuristic medieval society by Dr. Benign. His namesake derives from the pair of sentient talking gauntlets he wears along with his magical suit. In this society, Apollo Gauntlet fights evil while trying to capture Dr. Benign.

Characters
 Apollo Gauntlet (voice by Myles Langlois)
 King Bellenus (voice by Tom Kenny)
 Daphne (voice by Kelsy Abbott)
 Superknife (voice by Ryan Kwanten)
 Monty (voice by Mark Proksch)
 Rubis (voice by Betsy Sodaro)
 Orenthal Bellenus (voice by James Urbaniak)

Episodes

Pilot (2016)

Season 1 (2017)

Release and reception
Apollo Gauntlet began airing on Adult Swim in July 2017. The pilot aired in December 4, 2016, and was previously released on Adult Swim's official website in August 2016, along with the pilots for several prospective television series, including Brian Wysol's Hot Streets. Viewers could rate each pilot by clicking one of five buttons corresponding to their reactions.

Daniel Kurland of the Den of Geek called the plainness of its animation style unique, identifying influences from the He-Man animated series and other animated fares from the 1960s and '70s. Kurland wrote that its setting would allow many stories to be told and that the "rogues' gallery of creatures" prevalent in the pilot were indicative of many more "exciting" creatures. The A.V. Club William Hughes called both Apollo and Hot Streets "very Adult Swim–esque", writing that they felt in tandem with Adult Swim's "core aesthetic of cheap-looking, surrealist animation mixed with self-aware dialogue, delivered with a distinctive slacker vibe".

References

External links
 

2010s American adult animated television series
2017 American television series debuts
2017 American television series endings
American adult animated superhero television series
English-language television shows
Adult Swim original programming
Television series by Williams Street